Andrews Kwame Pianim is a Ghanaian financier and former government official. He served as CEO of New World Investments, a company he co-founded in 1995. After ten years as a political prisoner, he made a 1996 bid to run for the presidency of Ghana.

Early life and family
Pianim attended Achimota School for his secondary education. He received a B.A. Double Honours in Economics and Political Science from the University of New Brunswick, Canada (1963) and M.A. in economics from Yale University (1964), USA. 

Pianim married a Dutch woman named Cornelia Pianim. Their youngest son Elkin Kwesi Pianim (born 1970), a Vassar College trained corporate financier, was married to media heiress Elisabeth Murdoch; Kwame Pianim has two grandchildren in common with Rupert Murdoch, namely Cornelia and Anna Pianim.

Economic and finance career
As an economist, his philosophy is multi-dimensional, but a consistent theme has been the essential incompatibility between the economic agenda of poor nations, or what ought to be their economic agenda, and the priorities of the Bretton Woods system. 
 
Pianim was chairman of the board at UBA Ghana from the bank's inception in Ghana in 2004 till 2014. He has been chairman of the board at Bayport Financial Services since 2002 and has also chaired the boards of Airtel Communications Ghana and e-Tranzact. He has also been school board chair at Ghana International School.

Politics
He was arrested with a group of soldiers including Sgt. Akata  Pore on 23 November 1982 following the capture of part of Gondar Barracks, Burma Camp in an apparent abortive coup attempt.

His attempts to contest the 1996 presidential elections on the ticket of the centre-right New Patriotic Party were scuppered when the Supreme Court ruled to uphold a controversial law preventing individuals convicted of treasonous acts from holding public office, even if such acts were committed during periods of unconstitutional rule.

Following the Court's decision, he resigned from politics to focus on private activities within the realm of development economics.

Recent activities
In 2001, he was appointed the chairman of the Public Utility Regulation Council (PURC) of Ghana, a high-level commission tasked with the responsibility of overseeing and regulating electricity and water utilities. He resigned in December 2007 as a result of differences with the then ruling NPP government of John A. Kufuor. He is the President of Old Achimotans Association.

References 

Alumni of Achimota School
Living people
Ghanaian economists
New Patriotic Party politicians
People convicted of treason
Ghanaian prisoners and detainees
Prisoners and detainees of Ghana
Year of birth missing (living people)
Place of birth missing (living people)
University of New Brunswick alumni
Yale University alumni